Morebeng, also known as Soekmekaar, is a small, rural town in the Molemole Local Municipality of the Capricorn District Municipality of the Limpopo province of South Africa. It is located about 65 km southeast of Louis Trichardt. Afrikaans for "look for each other", the name has been explained in a variety of ways.

References

Populated places in the Molemole Local Municipality